Peter Barrow (30 July 1813 – 6 October 1899) was a son of Sir John Barrow, 1st Baronet, and an early settler in the colony of Western Australia, becoming a magistrate and Guardian of Aborigines, Anglican priest and school teacher in York, Western Australia. He left the colony after two years and became a British consul.

In Western Australia 
Barrow was sent from England to be a Protector of Aborigines. He arrived in Western Australia on 2 January 1840 on Westmoreland, and was very quickly appointed as a magistrate and as a Guardian of Aborigines in York.

York
Barrow was fortunate to secure the close friendship of the resident magistrate, Rivett Henry Bland, and bought a  property from him for 10 pounds, on which he built a "small house".

Barrow was involved in the formation of the York Agricultural Society on 3 August 1840, becoming its first secretary and treasurer. However, Barrow came under the displeasure of certain of the members so that he was forced to resign before the first show was held.

He arranged the construction of a Church (St John’s) which could accommodate 100 people, and Barrow read church services; on one occasion he is reported to have delivered a "capital sermon".

Guardian of Aborigines
As Guardian of Aborigines, Barrow at first found his duties difficult; he reported in June 1840:

Nine months later, on 31 March 1841, Barrow reported :

To quote McLaren and Cooper:

Barrow published an advertisement about the cow: "A report having gone abroad that a cow had been speared, killed and eaten by natives in the neighbourhood of Addington, I beg leave, through the public press, to contradict the report, inasmuch as the same cow is now alive and well at Addington Farm. I am informed however that suspicions are entertained that a spear was thrown at it." A year before Barrow's arrival at York, two Aboriginal people had been hanged near York at the site of where they had murdered Sarah Cook and her baby daughter. In 1841, their bodies were still hanging at the site and Barrow commented: "The execution of the two natives, Barrabong and Doojeep, for the murder of Mrs Cook, appears to have had the most beneficial effect: their bodies are still hanging in chains, a terror to evil doers."

In Barrow's June 1841 report as Protector of Aborigines, he reported that in the northern and southern extremes of his territory, the Aboriginal tribes were not so peaceably disposed as those who are more directly in the heart of the settlement. He also refers to having "native constables". He visited Albany during the year in his capacity as Protector of Aborigines.

School 
Barrow offered to teach gratuitously any children that were sent to him, but he only had two students, the families in the York district being so spread out, with most children being taught by their parents or a tutor.  He also gave instruction to Aboriginal children and taught four of them the alphabet, including Cowits.

In April 1841, the "indefatigable" Barrow devised an ambitious plan to use his five room home as an international school, named Wallingford Classical and Mathematical Academy, teaching "the classics, mathematics, geography, polite literature and the rudiments of the Eastern languages". He published an advertisement aimed at "educating the rising generations of Western Australians" and also courting the hope of inducing families resident in India to send their children there, instead of to England. Fees were £100 a year. In the advertisement, he named as instructors John Burdett Wittenoom, Reverend Mears, Henry Maxwell Lefroy and himself, and Viveash as medical officer.  In another newspaper of the same date, Barrow published an advertisement saying "in consequence of unforeseen obstacles, Wallingford Academy will not be opened until further notice." Barrow then advertised his house to let for three to seven years.

On 3 September 1841, Barrow gave notice that he intended to leave the colony, and he sold his home to Bland for 200 pounds. He left the colony on 7 October, bound for Singapore.

Later life 
Barrow became British vice-consul of Caen, then of Rabat and Sallee in Morocco, then in 1862 of Nantes, then from 1866 to 1879 of Kerch. He died childless in Ouistreham, France on 6 October 1899.

Notes

References

1813 births
Settlers of Western Australia
Year of death missing